Together We Were Made is the third studio album by the British rock band the Feeling, released on 20 June 2011.

Critical reception

The album received a mixed response from critics, garnering a rating of 4.5 out of 10 from reviews aggregator Any Decent Music?.

Track listing

Charts

References

2011 albums
The Feeling albums
Albums produced by The Bullitts